Rest on the Flight into Egypt is a 1496-1498 oil on panel painting by Cima da Conegliano, now in the Calouste Gulbenkian Museum in Lisbon. Unusually for treatments of the scene, it also includes two saints, namely John the Baptist and Lucy.

References

Paintings in the collection of the Calouste Gulbenkian Museum
Paintings of the Madonna and Child by Cima da Conegliano
1490s paintings
Paintings depicting John the Baptist
Paintings of Saint Lucy
Cima
Angels in art